Chen Shiang-chyi (born 27 November 1969) is a Taiwanese actress. She has appeared in most of Tsai Ming-liang's feature films.

Career
When she was studying at the Taipei National University of the Arts, Chen was spotted by Edward Yang when he walked by her acting class. She then appeared in two of Yang's films. After her performance in A Confucian Confusion, which was premiered in the competition section of the 1994 Cannes Film Festival, she decided to go to New York City to study performing arts. She graduated from the Educational Theatre master's program in the Department of Music and Performing Arts Professions at New York University.

After Chen returned to Taiwan, she had starring roles in many of Tsai Ming-liang's films. She also appeared in Lin Cheng-sheng's Sweet Degeneration (1997), which was entered into the 48th Berlin International Film Festival. In 2014, she won the Best Actress award at the Golden Horse Film Festival for her performance in Exit.

Chen teaches at the Taipei National University of the Arts as an assistant professor of theatre.

Filmography

References

External links
 

1969 births
Living people
New York University alumni
Actresses from Kaohsiung
Taiwanese film actresses
Taiwanese Protestants
20th-century Taiwanese actresses
21st-century Taiwanese actresses
Taipei National University of the Arts alumni
Academic staff of Taipei National University of the Arts